Haudaudine was a French full-rigged ship owned by Société Anonyme des Armateurs Nantais. Built by Chantiers de Penhoët in Saint-Nazaire in 1902 and named after Pierre Haudaudine, she ran aground off New Caledonia on 3 January 1905 and sank shortly after the crew had abandoned the ship.

Haudaudine was the sister ship of Suomen Joutsen, the former school ship of the Finnish Navy, which is today a museum ship in Turku, Finland.

Description 

In 1902, the French shipping company Société Anonyme des Armateurs Nantais ordered two 3,100-ton full-rigged ships from Chantiers de Penhoët in Saint-Nazaire. The first ship was launched on 7 August 1902 and christened Laënnec after the French doctor René Laennec. She was followed by Haudaudine, which was launched on 18 September 1902 and named after an 18th-century French merchant and politician from Nantes, Pierre Haudaudine.

Her tonnage was 2,393 register tons gross, 1,734 register tons net and 3,100 tons deadweight. She had a crew of 25.

Final voyage 

Haudaudine left Koné, New Caledonia, on 3 January 1905. She had arrived earlier from Yokohama, Japan, in ballast and was loaded for her homeward voyage with 3,042 tons of nickel ore from the Katavite mines bound for Rotterdam, Germany. After having been towed clear of the reefs by tugboat SS St. Pierre, she set sail in a fresh breeze. However, at sunset the wind died out and the strong currents began pushing Haudaudine towards the Contrariété Reef between Cape Goulvain and Porondu Island. Powerless to stop the ship or alter the course, the captain ordered soundings to be taken every few minutes to determine the water depth.

When the bow of Haudaudine collided with the coral reef, the ship swerved around and her stern hit the reef several times, flooding the aft compartments. Within three hours the stern had settled down and the captain gave an order to abandon ship for the crew of 25 and three passengers. After the lifeboats had been launched, Haudaudine heeled to port, capsized and sank on the reef with seven feet of water over the starboard side. The lifeboats reached Port Moneo and Bourail in the following morning.

Haudaudine was a total loss and storms eventually broke her up on the reef. Some remains, such as the auxiliary boilers, are still visible on the reef. Her helm has been restored and put on display in the New Caledonia Maritime History Museum.

References 

Full-rigged ships
Tall ships of France
Ships built by Chantiers de l'Atlantique
1902 ships
Maritime incidents in 1905
Ships sunk with no fatalities
Shipwrecks in the Pacific Ocean
Windjammers